Clarence L. Cooper Jr. (1934 – 1978) was an American author.

Biography
Clarence Cooper Jr. wrote seven crime novels that describe life in Black America, in the underworld of drugs and violence and in jail (The Farm). Cooper worked as an editor for The Chicago Messenger around 1955. He was said to have started taking heroin at this time. His first book, The Scene, was a success with the critics. It had been published by serious Random House, but his other three books were published by Regency, a pure paperback publisher, while Cooper was in prison in Detroit: Weed (1961), The Dark Messenger (1962) and Yet Princes Follow together with Not We Many, as Black: Two Short Novels (1962). Harlan Ellison was his editor. His last book, The Farm, plays at the Lexington prison for drug addicts, once called U.S. Narcotics Farm. Cooper's addiction and a growing alienation from those around him, perhaps driven by the hostile response to his fiction, all contributed to his early destitute death.

Death
Cooper died penniless, strung out and alone in the 23rd street YMCA New York City in 1978.

Published works
 The Syndicate (1960), as "Robert Chestnut", Chicago: Newsstand
 The Scene (1960), described by the Library of Congress as autobiographical. .
 Weed (1961).
 The Dark Messenger (1962) 
 Black, 2 short novels: Yet Princes Follow, Not We Many (1962)
 The Farm (1967). Crown Publishers. repr. .
 Black (1997), a collection of three short novels: "The Dark Messenger", "Yet Princes Follow", "Not We Many". .
 Weed and The Syndicate (1998)

References

Bibliography
 Serendipity Books, African-American, African & Caribbean booklist, 1998

External links
 Marc Gerald. "Old School Noir", Salon.com, 1997-03-07

1934 births
1978 deaths
African-American novelists
20th-century American novelists
American male novelists
20th-century American male writers
20th-century African-American writers
African-American male writers